Back to Blood is Tom Wolfe's fourth and final novel, published in 2012 by Little, Brown.  The novel, set in Miami, Florida, focuses on the subject of Cuban immigrants there.

Background 
Wolfe's 1998 novel A Man in Full, about a real-estate mogul in Atlanta during that city's economic boom of the 1990s, was a considerable success.  An estimated 1.4 million copies of the book were sold in hardcover alone.  Wolfe followed A Man in Full with 2004's I Am Charlotte Simmons, the story of a sheltered teenage girl attending a fictitious prestigious university where she is forced to navigate the world of undergraduate athletics, emerging sexuality, and academic integrity.  The book was considered disappointing by many critics, and sales were much lower: Nielsen BookScan placed hardback sales at 293,000 copies and paperback sales at 138,000.

All of Wolfe's essay collections, non-fiction, and fiction had been published by Farrar, Straus & Giroux since his first book The Kandy-Kolored Tangerine-Flake Streamline Baby in 1965. But after the relatively disappointing sales of I Am Charlotte Simmons, Wolfe was unable to agree on terms for the new novel with his publisher of 42 years. The Associated Press reported that Wolfe had been offered a reduced advance for Back to Blood. An excerpt from the novel was shown to several publishers; Wolfe sold the rights to publish his novel to Little, Brown for a sum of close to US$7 million, according to The New York Times, in an auction that ended shortly before Christmas of 2007.

Content
Even before the novel was finished, some details were reported in the media. The novel has been described as Wolfe's take on "class, family, wealth, race, crime, sex, corruption and ambition in Miami, the city where America's future has arrived first." Racial anxieties were a key source of tension in The Bonfire of the Vanities—Back to Blood will similarly feature characters of Cuban, Haitian, Russian, and French ancestry in the melting pot of Miami.

Of the subject matter, Wolfe said, "Two years ago when I got the idea of doing a book on immigration, people would say, 'Oh, that’s fascinating,' and then they would go to sleep standing up like a horse. Since then the subject has become a little more exciting, and in Miami, it's not only exciting, it’s red hot." Wolfe, who is well known for the depth of reporting that goes into his novels, has generated buzz for the novel through his extensive reporting, The Wall Street Journal reported that Miami retailers anticipated strong sales for the novel.

Release and reception
The book was released on October 23, 2012 to mixed reviews. The book debuted at #4 on the New York Times Hardcover Fiction Bestseller List on November 11, 2012. It remained on the list for three weeks. Back to Blood was an even bigger commercial failure than I Am Charlotte Simmons, selling 62,000 copies as of February 2013, according to Bookscan. Considering the publishers paid $7 million for the manuscript, this means the book cost approximately $112 per reader.

Footnotes

Novels by Tom Wolfe
2012 American novels
Novels set in Miami
Little, Brown and Company books